The Canton of Fontaine-le-Dun is a former canton situated in the Seine-Maritime département and in the Haute-Normandie region of northern France. It was disbanded following the French canton reorganisation which came into effect in March 2015. It consisted of 16 communes, which joined the canton of Saint-Valery-en-Caux in 2015. It had a total of 4,497 inhabitants (2012).

Geography 
A farming area in the arrondissement of Dieppe, centred on the town of Fontaine-le-Dun. The altitude varies from 0m (Saint-Aubin-sur-Mer) to 128m (Anglesqueville-la-Bras-Long) for an average altitude of 68m.

The canton comprised 16 communes:

Angiens
Anglesqueville-la-Bras-Long
Autigny
Bourville
Brametot
La Chapelle-sur-Dun
Crasville-la-Rocquefort
Ermenouville
Fontaine-le-Dun
La Gaillarde
Héberville
Houdetot
Saint-Aubin-sur-Mer
Saint-Pierre-le-Vieux
Saint-Pierre-le-Viger
Sotteville-sur-Mer

Population

See also 
 Arrondissements of the Seine-Maritime department
 Cantons of the Seine-Maritime department
 Communes of the Seine-Maritime department

References

Fontaine-le-Dun
2015 disestablishments in France
States and territories disestablished in 2015